Pierre Joly dit Dumesnil (born 10 December 1931) is a French former swimmer. He competed in the men's 200 metre breaststroke at the 1952 Summer Olympics.

References

External links
 

1931 births
Living people
Olympic swimmers of France
Swimmers at the 1952 Summer Olympics
Place of birth missing (living people)
French male breaststroke swimmers